Kvetera Church is a Georgian Orthodox church in a historic fortified town of Kvetera in Kakheti.

Kvetera Church was built in the early part of the 10th century. It is a relatively small church and resembles the Georgian cross-dome  style of architecture. The dome rests on a round tympanum and rises over the central square pace. The Projections end in an apse, which have niches between them. The facade of the church is not designed with many ornaments which is typical for Kakhetian churches. Most of the facade is decorated with symmetrical arches. 

Town of Kvetera used to one of the center of the Principality of Kakheti. According to Vakhushti Bagrationi, Kvetera dates back at least to 8th century AD. It is also mentioned in the written document from the 11th century.

Gallery

See also
 Tsinandali
 Gremi

Notes and references 

Churches in Georgia (country)
Eastern Orthodox church buildings in Georgia (country)
10th-century churches in Georgia (country)
Buildings and structures in Kakheti
World Heritage Tentative List